Four Canadian naval units have been named HMCS Ottawa.
  (III) was  that served in the RCN and Canadian Forces from 1956–1992.
  (IV) is a  commissioned in 1996.

Battle honours
 Atlantic, 1939–45.
 Normandy, 1944.
 English Channel, 1944.
 Biscay, 1944.
 Arabian Sea

References

 Directorate of History and Heritage - HMCS Ottawa 

Royal Canadian Navy ship names